The Milwaukee Secure Detention Facility is a state prison for men located in Milwaukee, Wisconsin. It is owned and operated by the Wisconsin Department of Corrections. The facility opened in October 2001 and holds 1,040 inmates at medium security. The building is located along Interstate 43 one block north of the Milwaukee County Courthouse.
  
A 350-stall parking garage is also part of the facility.

References

Prisons in Wisconsin
Buildings and structures in Milwaukee County, Wisconsin
2001 establishments in Wisconsin